Rajan P. Dev (20 May 1951 – 29 July 2009) was an Indian film and stage actor. He was born in Cherthala in the Alappuzha district of the former state Thiru-Kochi (present day Kerala). He had acted in over 500 films in Malayalam, Tamil, Telugu and Kannada languages. He was noted for his villain roles laced with a touch of humour. He came into the limelight for his characterisation of Kochuvava in the play Kattukuthira. Rajan P. Dev died in Kochi Wednesday 29 July 2009 due to a liver disease.

Family 
Rajan P. Dev was born to S. J. Dev, a popular stage and drama actor of his times, and Kuttyamma in 1951 at Cherthala. He has a sister, Raniyamma. He had his education from Govt. Boys Higher Secondary School, Cherthala, St. Michael's College, Cherthala and Sree Narayana College, Cherthala.

Rajan P. Dev was married to Shanthamma. The couple had three children; Asha, Jubil Raj and Unni. Asha is married to Binoy, a hotel businessman. Jubil Raj has been an actor from 2009. He has done more than 20 movies  in Malayalam and Tamil. He has done some major roles in Yakshiyum Njanum, Thappana, Thank You, Daivathinte Swantham Cleetus, KQ, Welcome to Central Jail, King Liar, An International Local Story, Maffi Dona,  Kaaval, etc. His younger son Unni also acted in movies like Zachariayude Garbhinikal, Aadu and its sequel.

Stage career
Rajan P. Dev, born to noted stage actor S. J. Dev and Kuttyamma, started his acting career with various professional play troupes in Kerala. His father remained one of his major influences. He was noted for his performances in various plays in the troupe of senior stage actor N. N. Pillai. He was cast by S. L. Puram Sadanandan to do the protagonist role of Kochuvava in his play Kattukuthira. The play was staged in over 100 venues and Dev became immensely popular all over Kerala. He received the Kerala State Theater Best Actor Award in 1984 and 1986. Along with his successful stage career, Dev launched his film career. Despite his success in films, he maintained a steady relationship with stage plays. He founded the play troupe Jubilee Theatres; and for its plays he did creative contributions in various departments. The last play by Jubilee Theatres, a satire titled Amminipuram Gramapanchayat had its lyrics and music by Dev.

Film career
Dev launched his film career with Ente Mamattikkuttiyammakku (1983), directed by Fazil. When his superhit play Kattukuthira was made into a film, the role went to Thilakan. Dev expressed his disappointment on this in a magazine interview, which caught the attention of director Thampy Kannanthanam. He invited Dev to play the villain role of Carlos in his film Indrajaalam (1990), starring Mohanlal. Just like his character Kochuvava, Carlos also became immensely popular so much so that for some years since then Dev was often referred to as Carlos, much like Keerikkadan Jose another popular villain character of that time. The role of Carlos proved to be career-defining for Dev, as he was showered with villain roles in a number of films.

Several of Dev's villain roles had a touch of comedy, but he could not get out of the typical villain character mould. He got a break from this with Aniyan Bava Chetan Bava (1995), directed by Rajasenan, in which he played Aniyan Bava, the younger brother to Chettan Bava, played by Narendra Prasad. The film established his versatility. He went on to act in full-fledged comedy roles after it, most notably in the films Sphadikam (1995), Thommanum Makkalum (2005) and Chota Mumbai (2007). He still continued to act his signature villain roles. He expanded his career to Tamil, Telugu and Kannada films starting with Gentleman (1993), directed by S. Shankar. He acted in over 50 films in those languages, most of which were villain roles. Out of about 800 films he acted in, many of the roles he played were of corrupt police officer, minister, etc., another testimonial to the several typecast roles he had to act in. Dev has directed three films: Achammakuttiyude Achayan (1998), Maniyarakkallan and Achante Kochumolku (2003). He was planned to direct two more films titled Kayal Rajavu and Simham, starring Mammootty and Prithviraj, respectively.

Death
Rajan P. Dev suffered from various disease like diabetes and liver cirrhosis during his last times. He was admitted to hospital many times due to these problems. He also lost his sight due to diabetes, and suffered without seeing camera during many shootings. On 26 July 2009, he vomited high amounts of blood at his home in Angamaly, and was admitted to Little Flower Hospital near his home. Later, he was shifted to Lake Shore Hospital in Kochi for advanced treatment, where he died on 29 July, aged 58. The last film that he had acted in was Ringtone, directed by Ajmal.

Filmography

As an actor

Malayalam

 Kaaval (2021)
The Priest(2021)(Photo presence)
 Rhythm (2013)
 Ringtone (2010)
 Vandae Maatharam (2010)
 Brahmasthram(2010) as Ramachandran
 Black Stallion (2010) as Sebastain
 Sambhu (2009)
 Daddy Cool (2009)
 Ee Pattanathil Bhootham(2009)
 I. G. (2009)
 Hailesa (2009)
 Love In Singapore (2009) as Irumbu Mani
 Bullet (2008)
 Aayudham (2008) as Plavinchottil Chacko
 Shakespeare M. A. Malayalam  (2008)
 Dae! Ingottu Nokkiye... (2008)
 Gopalapuranam (2008) as Gopalan Nair
 Sound of Boot (2008)
 Lollipop (2008)
 Kanichukulangarayil CBI (2008) as Krishna Gopan
 Annan Thambi(2008)
 Mayabazar (2008) as Akri Damodharan
 Roudram (2008)
 Chocolate (2007)
 Indrajith (2007) as 'Chemparunthu' Bhaskaran 
 Kichamani M.B.A. (2007)
 Black Cat (2007)... Tharakan
 Alibhai (2007) as Karunakaran Thampi
 Nadiya Kollappetta Rathri (2007)
 Athisayan (2007)
 Abraham & Lincoln (2007) as Rahim Ravuthar
 Chotta Mumbai (2007)
 Sketch (2007) as Chandrasekhara Shetty
 Nagaram (2007)... Lonappan
 Panthaya Kozhi (2007) as Jyotsar
 Raavanan (2007) as Raman Menon
 Oruvan (2006)
 Highway Police (2006) as David D'Souza
 Pothan Vava (2006)
 Vargam (2006)
 The Tiger (2005)
 Benglauil Oudda (2005)
 Chanthupottu (2005)
 Bharatchandran IPS (2005)
 Pandippada (2005)
 Thaskara Veeran (2005)
 Kalyana Kurimanam(2005) as Aravindaksha Kuruppu
 Udayon (2005) as Chetti
 Thommanum Makkalum (2005)
 Isra (2005)
 Natturajavu (2004)
 Aparichithan (2004)
 Shambu (2004) as Puthukodi Balan
 Thekkekkara Superfast (2004) as Philippose
 Vajram (2004) as Varghese
 Vellinakshatram (2004)
 C. I. Mahadevan 5 Adi 4 Inchu (2004) as Nambiar
 Sethurama Iyer CBI (2004)
 Vamanapuram Bus Route (2004)
 Kusruthi (2004)
 Relax (2003)
 Achante Kochumolku(2003) as Gabriel Panachikkadan
 Swantham Malavika (2003)
 The King Maker Leader (2003) as Kaimal
 Jagathi Jagathish in Town (2002) as Minister Vishwanadan
 Kai Ethum Doorathu (2002)
 Oomappenninu Uriyadappayyan (2002)
 Sivam (2002)
 Njan Rajavu (2002)
 Akhila (2002) as Sekharan Nair
 Swarna Medal (2002) as Balakrishanan
 Videsi Nair Swadesi Nair (2002)
 Nariman (2001)
 Sharjah To Sharjah (2001)
 Karumadikkuttan (2001)
 Ee Nadu Innalevare  (2001) as C.M 
 Nagaravadhu (2001)
 Kakkinakshathram (2001) as Anamuttathu Hajiyar
 Nakshathragal Parayathirunnathu (2001)
 Rakshasa Rajav (2001)
 Vakkalathu Narayanankutty (2001)
 Cover Story (2000)
 Rapid Action Force (2000) as Koshy Nainan
 Mera Naam Joker (2000) as Ittoop
 The Warrant (2000) as Navajeevan Madhavji
 Dada Sahib (2000) as Skaraia Zachariah
 Satyameva Jayate (2000)
 Kallukondoru Pennu (2000) as Sreekandan
 Aakasha Ganga (1999)
 Aayiram Meni (1999)
 Parasala Pachan Payyannoor Paramu (1999)
 Crime File (1999) as Mammala Mammachen
 Deepasthambham Mahascharam (1999)
 Ezhupunna Tharakan (1999) as Kumbanadan Lazar
 Independence (1999)
 Jananayakan(1999) as Doraiswami
 Panchapandavar (1999)
 Swastham Grihabaranam (1999)
 Alibabayum Arara Kallanmarum (1998)
 Achaammakkuttiyude Achaayan (1998), also director (debut)
 Dravidan (1998)
 Grama Panchayath (1998)
 Kallu Kondoru Pennu (1998)
 Vismayam (1998)
 Kalaapam (1998) as Vaniyamkulam Vishwam
  Kottaram Veettile Apputtan (1998)
 Varnapakittu (1997) as Pappan
 Aattuvela (1997)
 Bhoopathi (1997)
 Masmaram (1997)
 Asuravamsam (1997) as Moosa Settu
 Ekkareyanente Manasam (1997) as Sumathi's Uncle
 Janathipathyam (1997)
 Junior Mandrake (1997)
 Kalyana Unnikal (1997)
 Kottapurathe Koottukudumbam (1997)
 Manthramothiram (1997)
 Newspaper Boy (1997)
 Azhakiya Ravanan (1997)
 Kinnam Katta Kallan (1996) as Doctor Raghav
 Malayala Masom Chingam Onnu (1996)
 Mookkilla Rajyathu Murimookkan Rajavu (1996)
 Sathyabhaamaykkoru Pranayalekhanam (1996)
 Mr. Clean (1996)
Dominic Presentation (1996) as Marthandan Pilla
 Yuvathurki (1996)
 Patanayakan (1996)
 Saamoohyapadom (1995)
 Alanchery Thambrakal (1995)
 The King (1995)
 Special Squad (1995) as Fernandez
 Peterscott (1995) as Doctor
 Thirumanassu (1995) as Divan Thampi 
 Oru Abhibhashakante Case Diary (1995)
 Agrajan (1995)
 Aniyan Bava Chetan Bava (1995)
 Kalamasseriyil Kalyanayogam (1995)
 Karma (1995)
 Kidilol Kidilam (1995)
 Mimics Action 500 (1995) as Manimala Mamachan
 Kokkarakko (1995)
 Maanthrikam (1995)
 Mazhavilkoodaram (1995)
 Puthukkottayile Puthumanavalan (1995)
 Commissioner (1995)
 Spadikam (1995) as Manimala Vakkachan
 Ezharakkoottam (1995)
 Three Men Army (1995)
 Tom & Jerry (1995)
Cabinet (1994) as Varghesekutty
 Kudumba Visesham (1994)
 Manathe Kottaram (1994)
 Njan Kodiswaran (1994)
 Kambolam (1994) as Thommichan
 Rudraksham (1994)
 Kadal (1994) as Musthafa Haji
 Gandeevam (1994) as Karunakaran Nair 
 Puthran (1994) as Easho
 Chukkan (1994) as Anandakrishna Iyyer
 Commissioner (1994) as Rajan Philip 
 Palayam (1993)
 Gentleman (1993)
 Aayirappara (1993)
 Ekalavyan (1993)
 Injakkadan Mathai & Sons (1993)
 Janam (1993) as Dasappan
 Mafia (1993) as Moosakutty
 Pravachakan (1993)
 Sthalathe Pradhana Payyans (1993)
 Ente Ponnu Thampuran (1992)
 First Bell (1992)
 Kizhakkan Pathrose (1992) as Chandi Muthalaali
 Ardram (1992) as Mathai
 Kaazhchakkppuram (1992)
 Maanyanmaar (1992)
 Aparatha (1992) as Madhavan
 Kuttapathram (1991) as Augustine Fernandez
 Mookkilyarajyathu (1991)
 Amina Tailors (1991) as Hydrose Moori
 Thudarkadha (1991) as Receiver Shivasankaran
 Chakravarthy (1991) as Patrick Perreira 
 Ezhunnallathu (1991)
 Kadinjool Kalyanam (1991) as Thalaivar Vellai Chami
 Oliyampukal (1990) as Nanu
 Appu (1990)
 Ee Kannilkoodi (1990)
 Indrajaalam (1990) as Carlos
 Vyooham (1990)
 Swantham Ennu Karuthi (1989)
 Samvalsarangal (1988)
 Pappan Priyappetta Pappan (1986)
 Shyama (1986)
 Makan Ente Makan (1985)
 Akalathe Ambili (1985)
 My Dear Kuttichathan (1984) as School Teacher 
 Ente Mamattikkuttiyammakku (1983)
 Sphodanam (1981)
 Sanchary (1981) Chekuthaan Varghese

Tamil

 Malayan (2009)
 Karthik Anitha (2009)
 Thenavattu (2008)
 Vambu Sandai (2008)
 Manase Mounama (2007)
 Kalinga (2006)
 Aathi (2006)
 Manthiran (2005)
 Sukran (2005)
 Campus (2004)
 Jai (2004)
 Nadhi Karaiyinile (2003)
 Sri Bannari Amman (2002)
 Bala (2002)
 Red (2002)
 Thaalikaatha Kaaliamman (2001)
 Maayi (2000)
 Kushi (2000)
 Simmasanam (2000)
 Aasaiyil Oru Kaditham (1999)
 Poomagal Oorvalam (1999)
 En Uyir Nee Thaane (1998)
 Golmaal (1998)
 Periya Idathu Mappillai (1997)
 Love Today (1997)
 Vaimaye Vellum (1997)
 Selva (1996)
 Sengottai (1996)
 Gentleman (1993)
 Suriyan (1992)
 Naangal (1992)
 Vasanthakala Paravai (1991)

33. 'Vaaimaiye Vellum' (1997)

Telugu

 Krishna (2008)
 Lakshmi Putrudu (2008) 
 Kalidasu (2008)
 Yogi (2007)
 Veerabhadra (2005)
 Bunny (2005)
 Balu ABCDEFG (2005)
 Gudumba Shankar (2004)
 Arjun (2004)
 Arya (2004)
 Kodukku (2004)
 Pranam (2003)
 Seethaya (2003)
 Okkadu (2003)
 Dil (2003)
 Aayudham (2003)
 Naaga (2003)
 Aadi (2002)
 Khushi (2001)
 Gentleman (1993)

As director
 Achamakuttiyude Achayan (1998)
 Achante Kochumol (2003)
 Maniyarakallan (2005)

Serials
Samayam (Asianet)
Ashtapadi (Surya TV)
Kadamattathu Kathanaar (Asianet)
Sanmanassulavarkku  Samadhanam (Asianet)
Swami Ayappan (Asianet)
123 Sat (Asianet)
Kaala (Kairali TV)

References

External links
 Rajan P Dev at MSI
 

1954 births
2009 deaths
Indian male film actors
Male actors from Kerala
People from Thiruvalla
Male actors in Malayalam cinema
20th-century Indian male actors
Male actors in Tamil cinema
Male actors in Telugu cinema
Malayalam film directors
21st-century Indian film directors
Film directors from Kerala
21st-century Indian male actors